Ernest John Campbell (23 September 1903 – 13 July 1993) was a Progressive Conservative party member of the House of Commons of Canada. Born in Chatham Township, Ontario, he was a farmer by career.

He was first elected at the Lambton—Kent riding in the 1957 general election and re-elected there in the 1958 election. He was defeated by John Burgess of the Liberal party in the 1962 election.

References
 

1903 births
1993 deaths
Farmers from Ontario
Members of the House of Commons of Canada from Ontario
Progressive Conservative Party of Canada MPs